Simisola Feyishayo Awujo (born September 23, 2003) is a soccer player. Born in the United States, she represents Canada at international level.

Early life
Awujo began playing youth soccer at age 7 with AFC Lightning. Afterwards, she played youth soccer with NASA Tophat.

College career
In 2021, she began attending the University of Southern California, where she played for the women's soccer team. She scored her first goal on September 5, 2021 against the Western Michigan Broncos. After her first season, she was named to the  Pac-12 All-Freshman Team. As a sophomore, she was named an All-Pac 12 First Team All-Star and to the Academic All-District Team.

International career
Awujo was eligible to represent the United States (where she was born), Nigeria (where her parents were born), and Canada (as her mother is a citizen).

In 2019, she represented the United States U17 at a UEFA Women’s Development Tournament in the Czech Republic.

In January 2022, she attended her first camp with the Canada U20, later being selected for to the rosters for the 2022 CONCACAF Women's U-20 Championship, where she won a bronze medal, and the 2022 FIFA U-20 Women's World Cup rosters, where she played every minute.

In August 2022, she earned her first callup to the Canadian national team for a pair of friendly matches against Australia. She made her debut on September 3, 2022, coming on as a substitute. She was named the women's 2022 Canada Soccer Young Player of the Year.

References

External links

Living people
2003 births
Canadian women's soccer players
Soccer players from Atlanta
Women's association football midfielders
Canada women's international soccer players
American women's soccer players
USC Trojans women's soccer players
Canadian people of Nigerian descent
American people of Nigerian descent